Fragaria nipponica is a species of wild strawberry native to the western side of the Japanese island of Honshū, with a variety Fragaria nipponica var. yakusimensis on Yakushima. Some botanists treat it as a synonym of Fragaria yezoensis.

All strawberries have a base haploid count of 7 chromosomes. Fragaria nipponica is diploid, having 2 pairs of these chromosomes for a total of 14 chromosomes.

Fragaria nipponica, particularly var. yakusimensis, is cultivated in Japan for its edible fruit.

References

External links
 

nipponica
Flora of Northeast Asia
Flora of Japan
Berries